"Nellie the Elephant" is a children's song written in 1956 by Ralph Butler and Peter Hart about a fictional anthropomorphic elephant of that name.

Original version
The original version, released on Parlophone R 4219 in October 1956, was recorded by English child actress Mandy Miller with an orchestra conducted by Phil Cardew. It was arranged by Ron Goodwin and produced by George Martin. Although never a hit single, it was played countless times on BBC national radio in the UK in the 1950s and 1960s, particularly on Children's Favourites.

The chorus of the song is as follows:

Nellie the Elephant packed her trunk
And said goodbye to the circus
Off she went with a trumpety-trump
Trump, trump, trump

Children's author Jacqueline Wilson chose the song as one of her Desert Island Discs in October 2005.

Later versions
The punk rock band Toy Dolls did a cover version of this song, in 1982, which was later released on the 1983 album Dig That Groove Baby. Issued as a single, it reached No. 4 on the UK Singles Chart in 1984 and No. 97 in Australia.
In 1987, Black Lace released their version of the song which later appeared on their 2011 album The Essential Collection.
Lulu covered the song in 1989 as the theme song to the animated television series of the same name, in addition to voicing the title character. This version was also released as a single in 1990.

Rhythm
The rhythm and tempo of this song is often used to teach people the rhythm of cardiopulmonary resuscitation (CPR). The recommended rate for CPR is 100 chest compressions per minute. A study at Coventry University compared the effectiveness of this song in maintaining this rhythm with an alternative of "That's the Way (I Like It)" and no song at all. The version used for the study was from a Little Acorns brand children's record, and was found to have a tempo of 105 beats per minute.  Singing the chorus of the song twice, with a compression on each beat, results in exactly 30 compressions, which is the international standard for CPR.

The use of "Nellie" resulted in correct timing for 42 out of 130 cases, as compared with 15 for no music and just 12 for "That's the Way (I Like It)". However, the depth of compression was found to be inadequate in most of those cases, and the use of "Nellie" was found to increase this inadequacy slightly, as compared with the use of no music (56% too shallow with "Nellie" and 47% without).

More recently Bee Gees' "Stayin' Alive" has been promoted as an alternative.

References

Fictional elephants
1956 songs
1956 singles
Parlophone singles
1984 singles
1990 singles
Lulu (singer) songs
Toy Dolls songs
UK Independent Singles Chart number-one singles
English children's songs
Songs about elephants
Songs about fictional female characters
Song recordings produced by George Martin
Songs with lyrics by Ralph Butler
Radio theme songs